The West Indies Federation took part in the 3rd Pan American Games, held in Chicago, USA from 28 August 28 to 7 September 1959, under the name British West Indies. These were the only Pan American Games attended by the British West Indies, as the nation dissolved in 1962. British West Indies ended up 7th on the overall medal table, and 2nd on the medal table for Athletics.

Medals

Gold

Men's 400 metres: George Kerr
Men's 4x400 metres Relay: Mal Spence, Mel Spence, Basil Ince, and George Kerr

Silver

Men's 800 metres: George Kerr
Men's 100 metres: Mike Agostini
Men's 400 metres: Basil Ince

Featherweight (-60 kg): Maurice King

Bronze

Men's Long Jump: Lester Bird
Men's High Jump: Ernle Haisley
Men's 4x100 metres Relay: Dennis Johnson, Clifton Bertrand, Wilton Jackson, Mike Agostini
Men's 400 metres: Mal Spence
Men's 200 metres: Mike Agostini

Bantamweight (-56 kg): Grantley Sobers
Middleweight (-75 kg): Fred Marville

Other notable competitors

Mahoney Samuels took 8th place in the Triple Jump.
The Water Polo team included Barbadans John Burke, Reds Packer, Albert Weatherhead and Geoffrey Foster, who, apart from Fred Marville, were the only Barbabans in the West Indies contingent

See also
British West Indies at the 1960 Summer Olympics

References

GBR Athletics
Results
Olderr, Steven (2003). A Statistical History 1951–1999 Pan American Games. McFarland. .

West Indies Federation